Catherine Josephine Van Fleet (December 29, 1915 – June 10, 1996) was an American stage, film, and television actress. During her long career, which spanned over four decades, she often played characters much older than her actual age. Van Fleet won a Tony Award in 1954 for her performance in the Broadway production The Trip to Bountiful, and the next year she won an Academy Award for Best Supporting Actress for her supporting role in East of Eden.

Early life and training
Josephine was born in 1915 in Oakland, California, the younger of two daughters of Indiana and Michigan natives Roy H. Van Fleet and Elizabeth "Bessie" Catherine (née Gardner). Her father Roy worked for the railroads, but died of a streptococcus throat infection which was lanced, inadvertently spreading the disease throughout his body.  Federal census records show that by age five Josephine, her 18-year-old sister Corinne, and their mother were living in Oakland with Bessie's relatives, Ralph and Mary Gardner. To help support herself and her two daughters at her parents' home, Bessie, who had been widowed by 1920, worked as a "sales lady" in an Oakland dry goods store. 

While she had an early interest in stage productions, "Jo" graduated from the University of California, Berkeley in 1936, focusing on a variety of subjects, and then spent several years as a high school teacher in Morro Bay, California.  She continued her theatrical training in a graduate program at the College of the Pacific in Stockton, California. She moved after her graduation from her masters program to New York City, where she continued her training with Sanford Meisner at the Neighborhood Playhouse.

Career
In 1944, Van Fleet began her professional stage career and immediately distinguished herself in the role of Miss Phipps in the production of Uncle Harry at the National Theatre in Washington, D.C. Two years later, in New York, she distinguished herself as well on Broadway by her performances as Dorcas in Shakespeare's The Winter's Tale; and yet again, in 1950, as Regan opposite Louis Calhern in King Lear. She won the Tony Award for Best Featured Actress in a Play in 1954 for her portrayal of Jessie Mae Watts in Horton Foote's The Trip to Bountiful, costarring Lillian Gish and Eva Marie Saint.

Despite her early successes on the stage, Van Fleet continued to refine her skills in the late 1940s and early 1950s by studying with Elia Kazan and Lee Strasberg at the Actors Studio in New York. Kazan in 1952 directed her in the play Flight to Egypt and the following year in Camino Real. In 1954 he encouraged her to work in films in Hollywood. There Kazan cast her in his screen adaptation of John Steinbeck's East of Eden (1955) for Warner Bros. In that production—her film debut—Van Fleet portrays Cathy Ames, the mother of James Dean's character. Her performance, which was widely praised by critics, won her an Academy Award for Best Supporting Actress. Her subsequent film work was steady through 1960 and included films such as The Rose Tattoo (1955), I'll Cry Tomorrow (1955), The King and Four Queens (1956), and Gunfight at the O.K. Corral (1957). Her career, however, did not progress as she had hoped. Her friend and mentor, Kazan, personally experienced her frustrations: "'Jo stagnated, and, since she knew it, was bitter. And as she became bitter, she became more difficult.'" In an interview for the Los Angeles Times after her Oscar-winning performance in East of Eden, Van Fleet openly expressed her concerns "about being typecast in tragic roles".

In 1958, Van Fleet was nominated for a Tony Award for Best Actress in a Play for her performance in Look Homeward, Angel, in which she played the acquisitive mother of Anthony Perkins' character. Her later films included Wild River (1960), one of the productions in which she played a character far older than her actual age. Only age 44 at the time of Wild River, Van Fleet spent five hours every morning getting into make-up for her role as Ella, the 89-year-old matriarch of the Garth family. Some of her other notable roles include the Wicked Stepmother in Rodgers and Hammerstein's Cinderella (1965), Paul Newman's mother in Cool Hand Luke (1967), and the mother in I Love You, Alice B. Toklas (1968).

Van Fleet's work on television included such series as Naked City, Thriller, Bonanza, The Wild Wild West, and Police Woman. Among her most emotionally charged dramatic performances on television  is her portrayal of the bitter, explosive Mrs. Shrike in the 1956 episode "Shopping for Death" on Alfred Hitchcock Presents.

Van Fleet's final performance, a brief but "delicious" supporting turn in the 1986 TV adaptation of Saul Bellow's Seize the Day, elicited this comment from Washington Post critic Tom Shales:
Jo Van Fleet, who seems even to walk and blink legendarily, has a tiny part and only two small scenes as Mrs. Einhorn, an old woman with two incontinent dachshunds, but what a piquant impression she makes.

Personal life and death
Van Fleet in 1946 married choreographer William G. Bales, and they remained together until his death in 1990. The couple had one child, Michael. 

In February 1960, in recognition of her career in the motion-picture industry, as well as her work on stage and in television, Van Fleet was awarded a star on the Hollywood Walk of Fame. It is located at 7010 Hollywood Boulevard. Politically, she was a Democrat, and in the 1952 United States presidential election she supported Adlai Stevenson.

Van Fleet, at age 80, died from undisclosed causes in New York City at Jamaica Hospital in Queens. Her body was cremated and her ashes were returned to her family.

Filmography

References

External links

 
 
 
 
 

1910s births
1996 deaths
American film actresses
American stage actresses
Best Supporting Actress Academy Award winners
Donaldson Award winners
Tony Award winners
Actresses from Oakland, California
University of the Pacific (United States) alumni
20th-century American actresses
California Democrats
New York (state) Democrats